The Tree of Life is a 2011 American drama film written and directed by Terrence Malick. The film stars Brad Pitt, who also co-produced the film, Sean Penn, and Jessica Chastain. It explores the origin and meaning of life through the childhood memories of a middle-aged architect, Jack O'Brien (Penn). Jack questions his faith and seeks to find the purpose to his existence, while reconciling with his domineering father (Pitt); he however shares a gentle relationship with his mother (Chastain). The film's music was composed by Alexandre Desplat, and Emmanuel Lubezki served as the cinematographer.

Made on a budget of $32 million, The Tree of Life premiered at the 2011 Cannes Film Festival on May 16, 2011, where it was initially met with polarized reviews from critics. The film had its theatrical release on May 27, 2011, and earned over $54 million worldwide. Rotten Tomatoes, a review aggregator, surveyed 272 reviews and judged 85% to be positive. The film was nominated for 140 awards, winning 68; its direction, screenplay, cinematography, editing, visual effects, and music, as well as the performances of Pitt and Chastain, received the most attention from award groups.

The Tree of Life won the Palme d'Or at the Cannes Film Festival, becoming the first film from the United States to do so since Michael Moore's documentary film, Fahrenheit 9/11 (2004). At the 84th Academy Awards, the film received three nominationsBest Picture, Best Director for Malick, and Best Cinematography for Lubezki. The film earned four nominations at the 16th Satellite Awards: Best Supporting Actress – Motion Picture for Chastain, Best Original Screenplay for Malick, Best Cinematography for Lubezki, and Best Sound; it won for supporting actress and cinematography. The film was awarded Best Picture by the African-American Film Critics Association, Chicago Film Critics Association, Online Film Critics Society, San Francisco Film Critics Circle, and Toronto Film Critics Association. The American Film Institute, Dallas–Fort Worth Film Critics Association, IndieWire Critic's Poll, International Online Film Critics' Poll, and Village Voice Film Poll included The Tree of Life in their listing of the year's ten best films.

Awards and nominations

Notes

References

External links 
 

Tree of Life